Porthmadog railway station is a National Rail station in Porthmadog, Wales

Porthmadog railway station may also refer to:
 Porthmadog Harbour railway station, on the Ffestiniog & Welsh Highland Railways 
 Porthmadog railway station (Welsh Highland Heritage Railway)